This is a partial discography of complete performances of Wolfgang Amadeus Mozart's opera The Marriage of Figaro. This opera was first performed at the Burgtheater in Vienna on 1 May 1786.


Recordings

Films
The Marriage of Figaro has been filmed as opera several times.
1949 film, East German production with actors and dubbed singing voices, except for Willi Domgraf-Fassbaender as Figaro
1960 film, Australian TV film, sung in English
1976 film, directed by Jean-Pierre Ponnelle (see above)

References

Opera discographies
 *